Tartarus refers to a deity and place in Greek mythology.

Tartarus may also refer to:

Tartarus, a Greek New Testament word used for Hell (in Christian belief), derived from the pagan Greek use.
 Tartaros, a Norwegian black metal solo project by Charmand Grimloch aka Joachim Rygg.
 Tartarus (spider), a genus of spiders in the family Stiphidiidae.
 Tartarus, the Latin name of the river Tartaro-Canalbianco in Italy.
 HMS Tartarus, the name of three ships of the Royal Navy and one planned one.
 Tartarus (DC Comics), a group of DC comic book supervillains.
 Tartarus, a character in the Halo universe.
 Tartarus Press, a limited edition publishing house.
 Tartaros, a dark guild from the anime/manga Fairy Tail.
 Tartarus, a 2005 film by Dave Wascavage.

In other usage:
 A fictional "hottest point" of the sun in the novel Seven Ancient Wonders.
 A fictional planet in the computer game Warhammer 40,000: Dawn of War.
 A fictional planet in the Stargate SG-1 universe.
 The artificial person creation and maintenance arcology in Appleseed media.
 The name of the tower which is one of the primary locations in the video game Persona 3.
 The name of the landship piloted by Malkuthian colonel Jade Curtiss in the PS2 and 3DS video game Tales of the Abyss.
 The location villains are sent to in the cartoon series My Little Pony. The gate is guarded by Cerberus.
 A software backup program, for use in Unix and Unix-like environments such as Linux and FreeBSD.
 The name of a special prison for villains in the anime/manga series My Hero Academia.